The 1998–99 season was Colchester United's 57th season in their history and their first season back in the third tier of English football, the Second Division, following promotion via the play-offs in the previous season. Alongside competing in the Second Division, the club also participated in the FA Cup, the League Cup and the Football League Trophy.

After a reasonable start to the season, manager Steve Wignall quit in January expressing that he had taken the club as far as he could. Mick Wadsworth was appointed his replacement and duly brought in a number of new players on permanent and loan contracts. Colchester finished the season in 18th position, two points clear of the relegation zone.

The U's were ignominiously dumped out of the FA Cup in the first round by non-League outfit Bedlington Terriers. They also suffered first round exits in the League Cup and Football League Trophy to AFC Bournemouth and Gillingham respectively.

Season overview
Following promotion from the Third Division, Steve Wignall had a huge task ahead of him to keep Colchester in the division. The league boasted Manchester City and Stoke City amongst its ranks, as well as Kevin Keegan's Fulham during Mohamed Al-Fayed's ownership during their rise to the Premier League.

Wignall's side had a reasonable start to the campaign, but were dumped out of the League Cup and Football League Trophy at the first round stages. The U's then faced a trip to non-League side Bedlington Terriers in the FA Cup first round. Bedlington held a 2–0 lead after 23 minutes and eventually held a 4–0 lead after 86 minutes, before Tony Adcock scored a late consolation goal. Following this, Colchester one just one game in their next nine matches.

In January 1999, seven days after handing raw forward Lomana LuaLua his debut, Wignall quit the club, citing that he had taken the team as far as he could and left frustrated at the role agents were playing in deals he had been trying to set up. Assistant manager Steve Whitton stepped up as caretaker manager before Mick Wadsworth was named the new manager of Colchester United. He kept Whitton on as assistant and brought in a number of new players.

The club survived relegation by two points, ending the campaign in 18th place. Crowds had risen to an average of 4,479, but swingeing cuts were made to the playing staff at the end of the season.

Players

Transfers

In

 Total spending:  ~ £0

Out

 Total incoming:  ~ £0

Loans in

Loans out

Match details

Second Division

Results round by round

League table

Matches

Football League Cup

FA Cup

Football League Trophy

Squad statistics

Appearances and goals

|-
!colspan="16"|Players who appeared for Colchester who left during the season

|}

Goalscorers

Disciplinary record

Clean sheets
Number of games goalkeepers kept a clean sheet.

Player debuts
Players making their first-team Colchester United debut in a fully competitive match.

See also
List of Colchester United F.C. seasons

References

General
Books

Websites

Specific

1998-99
English football clubs 1998–99 season
1998–99 Football League Second Division by team